Granit may refer to:
 Granite, a type of rock
 Granit (name)
 Granit (beer), a Swedish lager beer
 Le Granit Regional County Municipality, Quebec, a regional county municipality in the Estrie region of eastern Quebec, Canada
Lannion – Côte de Granit Airport in France
 Granit, Bulgaria, a village in southern Bulgaria
Granit oak in Granit, Bulgaria
 2ES10 Granit, a Russian locomotive
 P-700 Granit, a Soviet and Russian naval anti-ship cruise missile

See also
Granite (disambiguation)